Semaeostomeae (literally "flag mouths") is an order of large jellyfish characterized by four long, frilly oral arms flanking their quadrate mouths. The umbrella is domed with scalloped margins, and the gastrovascular system consists of four unbranched pouches radiating outwards from the central stomach; no ring canal is present. They usually possess eight tentacles; four are per-radical and four are inter-radical.

Taxonomy
The order consists of five families.
 Family Cyaneidae
 Family Drymonematidae
 Family Pelagiidae
 Family Phacellophoridae
 Family Ulmaridae

Differentiation
The three traditional families, Pelagiidae, Cyaneidae, and Ulmaridae, are distinguishable by these characteristics:
 Gastrovascular cavity divided by radial septa into rhopalar and tentacular pouches
Pouches simple and unbranched – Pelagiidae
Pouches branched – Cyaneidae
Gastrovascular system in form of unbranched and branching canals, or with anastomosing radial canals – Ulmaridae

In addition, members of the Pelagiidae have no ring canal, and the marginal tentacles arise from umbrella margin.  Three genera are in this family.

Gallery

References

Collins, A. G.; Jarms, G.; Morandini, A. C. (2022). "Semaeostomeae". World Register of Marine Species. Retrieved 1 November 2022.
Ruppert, Edward E.; and Fox, Richard S. (1988). Seashore Animals of the Southeast, University of South Carolina Press, 273. .
Hayward, Peter J.; and Ryland, John S. (1995). Handbook of the Marine Fauna of North-West Europe, Oxford University Press, 65. .
Bayha K., Dawson M. (2010) New family of allomorphic jellyfishes, Drymonematidae (Scyphozoa, Discomedusae), emphasizes evolution in the functional morphology and trophic ecology of gelatinous zooplankton. Biological Bulletin 219: 249–267.

 
Discomedusae
Cnidarian orders